Assyrian nationalism is a movement of the Assyrian people that advocates for independence or autonomy within the regions they inhabit in northern Iraq, northeastern Syria, northwestern Iran, and southeastern Turkey. 

The Assyrian people claim descent from those who established the Mesopotamian Assyrian civilization and empire which was centered in Ashur, modern day Iraq, which at its height, covered the Levant and Egypt, as well as portions of Anatolia, Arabia and modern-day Iran and Armenia. The empire lasted from perhaps as early as the 25th century BC until its collapse around 7th century BC.  

The movement emerged in the late 19th century in a climate of increasing ethnic and religious persecution of the Assyrians in the Ottoman Empire, and is today commonly espoused by Assyrians in the Assyrian diaspora and Assyrian homeland.  

The Unrepresented Nations and Peoples Organization (UNPO) recognizes Assyrians as an indigenous people of northern Iraq, southeastern Turkey, northeastern Syria and the fringes of northwestern Iran, as does the Political Dictionary of the Modern Middle East.

Ideology
The ideology of Assyrian nationalism is based on the political and national unification of ethnic Assyrian followers of a number of Syriac Christian churches (mainly those originating in, or based in and around Upper Mesopotamia) with classical, Akkadian influenced Syriac as its cultural language and Eastern Aramaic dialects as spoken tongues. Its main proponents in the late 19th century and early 20th century were Naum Faiq, Freydun Atturaya, Ashur Yousif, Malik Khoshaba and Farid Nazha.

Within the Syriac Christian population in the near east as a whole, Assyrianism is confined specifically by certain geographic, ethnic, linguistic and confessional boundaries.

Geographically and linguistically, an Assyrianist position is held by those who speak Eastern Aramaic dialects who live or descend from those who once lived in northern Iraq, northeastern Syria, southeastern Turkey and northwestern Iran.

Theologically, the position is a little more complex. 
Followers of the Assyrian Church of the East, Ancient Church of the East, Chaldean Catholic Church, Assyrian Pentecostal Church and Assyrian Evangelical Church usually adhere to an Assyrianist position, although sometimes the term Chaldo-Assyrian is used to avoid theological conflict between Assyrian followers of the original Church of the East and those who broke away between the late 17th and early 19th centuries and entered communion with the Roman Catholic Church, which named this new church the Chaldean Catholic Church in 1830. Chaldean Catholics should not be confused with ancient Chaldeans, a long extinct people with whom they share no links.

Eastern Aramaic-speaking populations who follow the Syriac Orthodox Church and Syriac Catholic Church who live or descend from those who lived in northern Iraq, northeastern Syria, southeastern Turkey, northwestern Iran and the southern Caucasus tend to regard themselves as Assyrian, whereas formerly Western Aramaic-speaking and now almost exclusively Arabic-speaking Levantine members of these churches from the rest of Syria, Lebanon and south-central Turkey often espouse an Aramean, Phoenician (more common among Maronite Christians) or even Greek heritage (see Arameanism and Phoenicianism).

This is in part due to the term Syriac being generally accepted by the majority of scholars to be a 9th-century BC derivation of Assyrian which for many centuries was used in specific and sole relation to the Assyrians and Assyria, and in part because the majority of the Christian population of these areas are not geographically from what was Assyria or Mesopotamia, and thus do not identify with an Assyrian heritage in the way that the pre-Arab, pre-Islamic Mesopotamian Assyrians from Iraq, Syria, Turkey, Iran and the Caucus naturally do.
 
According to Raif Toma, Assyrianism goes beyond mere Syriac patriotism, and ultimately aims at the unification of all "Mesopotamians", properly qualifying as "Pan-Mesopotamianism". This variant of Assyrianism is independent of Christian, ethno-religious identity and qualifies as a purely ethnic nationalism, in that it identifies the Assyrian people as the heirs of the Assyrian Empire, and as the indigenous population of Mesopotamia, as opposed to Arabism, which is identified as a chronologically later, non-indigenous, and foreign intrusive element. This is expressed for example in the Assyrian calendar introduced in the 1950s, which has as its era 4750 BC; then thought to be the approximate date of construction of the first (pre-historical, pre-Semitic) temple to Ashur.

Organizations advocating Assyrianism are the Assyrian Democratic Organization, Bet-Nahrain Democratic Party, Assyrian Universal Alliance (since 1968) and Shuraya (since 1978). The Assyrian flag was designed by the Assyrian Universal Alliance in 1968.

Mordechai Nisan, the Israeli Orientalist, also supports the view that Assyrians should be named specifically as such in an ethnic and national sense, are the descendants of their ancient namesakes, and denied self-expression for political, ethnic and religious reasons.

Dr. Arian Ishaya, a historian and anthropologist of UCLA, states that the confusion of names applied to the Assyrians, and a denial of Assyrian identity and continuity, is on one hand borne out of 19th- and early 20th-century imperialism and condescension on the part of the west, rather than by historical fact, and on the other hand by long-held Islamic, Arab, Kurdish, Turkish and Iranian policies, whose purpose is to divide the Assyrian people along false lines and deny their singular identity, with the aim of preventing the Assyrians having any chance of unity, self-expression and potential statehood.

Naum Elias Yaqub Palakh (better known as Naum Faiq), a 19th-century advocate of Assyrian nationalism from the Syriac Orthodox Church community in Diyarbakır, encouraged Assyrians to unite regardless of tribal and theological differences.

Ashur Yousif, an Assyrian Protestant from the same region of southeastern Turkey as Faiq, also espoused Assyrian unity during the early 20th century, stating that the Church of the East, Chaldean Catholic and Syriac Orthodox Assyrians were one people, divided purely upon religious lines.

Freydun Atturaya (Freydon Bet-Abram Atoraya) also advocated Assyrian unity and was a staunch supporter of Assyrian identity and nationalism and the formation of an ancestral Assyrian homeland in the wake of the Assyrian genocide.

Farid Nazha, an influential Syrian-born Assyrian nationalist, was deeply critical of the leaders of the various churches adhered to by Assyrians, accusing the Syriac Orthodox Church, Assyrian Church of the East, Chaldean Catholic Church and Syriac Catholic Church of creating divisions among them, when their joint ethnic and national identity should be paramount.

Irredentism

The ideology of Assyrian independence is a political movement that supports the re-creation of Assyria as a nation state corresponding to part of the original Assyrian homeland, in the Nineveh Plains of northern Iraq and other areas in the Assyrian homeland. The issue of Assyrian independence has been brought up many times throughout the course of history from before World War I to the present-day Iraq War. The Assyrian-inhabited area of Iraq is located primarily but not exclusively in the Nineveh Governorate region in northern Iraq where the ancient Assyrian capital of Nineveh was located. This area is known as the "Assyrian Triangle." Assyrians are generally found all over northern Iraq, including in and around the cities of Mosul, Erbil, Kirkuk, Dohuk, Amedi and Rawandiz, and there are a fair number of exclusively Assyrian towns, villages, hamlets and agricultural communities in the north, together with others that have significant Assyrian populations. Other communities exist over the borders in southeastern Turkey (Mardin, Diyarbakır, Harran, Bohtan, Kültepe, Hakkari), northeastern Syria (Al-Hasakah, Qamlishi Khabur delta) region and northwestern Iran (Urmia).

In post-Ba'thist Iraq, the Assyrian Democratic Movement (or ADM) was one of the smaller political parties that emerged in the social chaos of the occupation.

Continuity claims

The continuity of Assyrian identity is endorsed and well supported by many non-Assyrian modern Assyriologists, Iranologists, orientalists, linguists, geneticists and historians, while others see the connection between ancient Assyria and the modern Assyrians as more complex. There was Assyrian resistance to Persian rule in Achaemenid Assyria. H. W. F. Saggs in his The Might That Was Assyria clearly supports cultural and historical continuity, as do Richard Nelson Frye, Simo Parpola, Robert D. Biggs and Patricia Crone among others.

Symbols

See also

References

Sources

Further reading

External links
Assyrian Nationalism: A Mechanism For Survival
The Origins and Development of Assyrian Nationalism, by Robert DeKelaita
Neo-Assyrianism & the End of the Confounded Identity
Assyrian Men
Nationalism